Soul Eater is the third book in the Chronicles of Ancient Darkness series written by Michelle Paver.

Plot summary
Wolf gets kidnapped by a group of strangers and Torak and Renn track his captors northwards. During their journey, Torak spirit walks in a raven, and discovers that the Soul Eaters, a group of evil mages, have captured Wolf. They follow them to the Far North, where they encounter Inuktiluk, leader of the White Fox Clan. They go with him to the White Fox Clan's camp, where the clan's mage tells them of a vision she has had, in which Torak is about to hit Wolf with an axe. Continuing their search for Wolf, they find the cave which the Soul-Eaters now inhabit. The mages are named as: Thiazzi, the Oak Mage; Nef, the Bat Mage; Seshru, the Viper Mage, and their chief Eostra, the Eagle Owl Mage.

Torak secretly changes places with a boy who is serving as an acolyte to the Soul Eaters. To maintain his disguise, Torak helps the Soul Eaters in their quest to release an army of demons, while Renn also enters their cave. While inside, Torak, after learning that his father once saved the Bat Mage's life, spirit walks in a bear and finds out where Wolf is. When Torak and Renn find Wolf, who is maddened by an injury to his tail and doesn't recognise them, they are forced to use Renn's axe to cut off Wolf's tail, fulfilling the mage's vision. They free all the animals which the Soul Eaters have been holding captive, but the Soul Eaters release demons in pursuit. Renn takes the Fire Opal, a religious artifact belonging to the Soul Eaters that can control demons, but as they flee, Torak and Renn become separated when Renn floats away on a piece of sea ice. Meanwhile, Torak becomes snow blind and is captured by the Soul Eaters.

Renn's ice floe eventually halts, and she realises that the Fire Opal can be destroyed by being buried under stone while a life is sacrificed. She intends to kill herself to get rid of the Fire Opal, but before she can do so, Torak and the Soul Eaters arrive. Torak spirit walks inside an ice bear and attacks the Soul Eaters. Renn is about to jump but at the last minute, the Bat Mage sacrifices herself to fulfill her debt to Torak's father. Having escaped from the three remaining Soul Eaters, Torak, Renn and Wolf are rescued by Fin-Kedinn and Inuktiluk. They return to the forest together, and deduce that the fire opal which was buried with Nef was only one of three fragments.

Notes

Editions
Soul Eater has been released in several languages including French, Dutch, Italian, Korean and Swedish.

2006 British novels
Children's fantasy novels
British children's novels
Chronicles of Ancient Darkness
2006 children's books
Novels set in the Arctic
Orion Books books